Frederic A. "Eric" Eidsness Jr. is a political engineer born December 1, 1944 to Fred A. Eidsness Sr. and Edith Polk Eidsness. He was appointed by President Ronald Reagan to the United States Environmental Protection Agency in 1982 with the advice and consent of the United States Senate, serving under Administrator Anne Gorsuch Burford during the controversial “Sewergate” era. 

He ran as a Reform Party candidate in the 4th Congressional district in Colorado in 2006. After earning 11.3% of the popular vote, he lost to Marilyn Musgrave. 

The collection of Eidsness' speeches, testimony, correspondence, journal articles, newspaper clippings, and water quality reports can be accessed at the Water Resources Archive in the Morgan Library of Colorado State University.

Early years and education

Born in Jacksonville, Florida, Eidsness grew up in Gainesville, Florida during the 1950s as his father was studying for his Ph.D. in chemistry at the University of Florida. In 1951, Fred Sr. joined Charlie Black and Bill Crow to form the sanitary engineering company BC&E, the forerunner to the modern day environmental engineering consulting companies. In 1977, BC&E merged with CH2M, later CH2M Hill, Inc. 

Eidsness' parents sent him to Holderness School, a New England all-boys preparatory school in 1959-1962 for a better education during which time his mother’s sister Barbara Washburn (née Polk) and Eidsness’ uncle Bradford Washburn served as his surrogate parents. Bradford Washburn was the founding manager of the Museum of Science (Boston). Eidsness studied engineering at Vanderbilt University (1963-67) and earned his Bachelor of Engineering degree. Both Eidsness' father and uncle influenced him to enter the environmental field.

Military service

Pursued by his local draft board in Alachua County, Florida, Eidsness was drafted out of Peace Corps training at Camp Mataguay in Escondido, California, but received a commission in the United States Navy. Nearing completion of officer training, Eidsness received a change of orders from explosive ordinance diving school to in-country Vietnam, where he served in combat in the Riverine Forces aboard  from June 1969 to June 1970, followed by duty at Naval Station Treasure Island in San Francisco Bay. He was honorably discharged in August 1970, remained in the United States Navy Reserve, and obtained a rank of full lieutenant until his separation in 1973.

EPA's founding and private sector employment

Eidsness entered federal service in the Water Quality Administration under the United States Department of the Interior in the fall of 1970, which on December 2, 1970 became the core of EPA’s Region 4 in Atlanta, Georgia. There he wrote EPA’s first Environmental impact statement (EIS) on a regional sewerage system in Cobb County, Georgia, during which time he worked closely with the late Dr. Claude Terry and other founders of a grassroots environmental organization, Friends of the River. Also, he managed the first truly interdisciplinary environmental impact study on "Ocean Outfalls and Other Methods of Treated Wastewater Disposal in Southeast Florida" and completed a study at EPA Headquarters on the applicability of the National Environmental Policy Act on Transportation Control Strategies developed locally under the Federal Clean Air Act.

Local water quality management planning

After two years with the international think tank, Arthur D. Little, Inc. in Cambridge, Massachusetts, where he learned the private sector trade of planning, budgeting, and managing large interdisciplinary studies, Eidsness joined the Larimer Weld Regional Council of Governments as director under an EPA Section 208 clean water grant (August 1975 to July 1978). There, he integrated the disparate parts of the Federal Clean Water Act and produced a 20-year plan to control pollution in this water resources-rich area of the west, challenging the EPA and State of Colorado norms regarding protecting local water quality. He joined one of his consulting firms, the boutique local land use planning and financial advisor consulting company, BMML, of Boulder, Colorado as a partner, where Eidsness opened an environmental division. After the Larimer Weld Regional Council of Governments was dissolved, the North Colorado Front Range Water Quality Association was formed and continues to carry out the 208 plan under 100% local funding – one of if not the only one of 149 designated planning agencies remaining after federal funding ran out in 1980.

Reagan administration career

In September 1981, Eidsness joined the EPA in Washington as assistant administrator-in-waiting.   He was confirmed in March 1982 by President Ronald Reagan as Assistant Administrator for Water  There, he had policy, budget, and management authority over three environmental statutes, the Federal Clean Water Act, the Marine Protection, Research, and Sanctuaries Act of 1972, and the Safe Drinking Water Act. With a staff of 2,000 located in Washington, ten EPA regions and several research laboratories, a budget of $200 million a year, and a $2.4 billion per year grant program for municipalities to build wastewater treatment plants, Eidsness led regulatory reform to reduce the paper burden on regulated communities, reduce the complexity of regulations, engender more collaboration with states and the scientific and engineering communities, clear a huge backlog of unfinished regulatory business left by the Carter EPA, and institute EPA’s first accountability system that drove national policy through EPA’s ten regions and 57 states and territories.  His signature regulatory reform was a body of regulations called Water Quality Standards that converted a useless tool to an effective regulatory program to protect local rivers, lakes, and streams.  After EPA’s first administrator William Ruckelshaus returned to serve again, this time as fifth administrator, Eidsness left the EPA in 1983.

Return to the private sector

Following his EPA service a second time, Eidsness entered the environmental engineering and hazardous waste remediation industry, where he specialized in thermal treatment technologies and turn-key project delivery for clean construction projects and hazardous waste remediation. Employers included RMT Northern Region serving primarily major manufacturing industry in the Rust Belt, Canonie Environmental Services Corp., and CH2M Hill in their Boca Raton, Orlando, and Denver Offices.

2006 Reform Party candidacy

In late 2005, then-Republican Eidsness launched an exploratory committee to examine the prospect of challenging incumbent Congresswoman Marilyn Musgrave in Colorado's 4th congressional district in the 2006 Republican Primary. Eidsness instead left the Republican Party and announced his candidacy for U.S. Congress from the 4th District on March 31, 2006, as a member of the Reform Party. Eidsness opposed both Musgrave and Democratic candidate Angie Paccione in the November 2006 General Election. Eidsness was declared the winner of a debate held in Windsor, Colorado and earned the endorsement of four of six major daily newspapers, including the hometown newspapers of both his major-party opponents, the Fort Morgan Times, Musgrave’s hometown paper, and the Greeley Tribune which had always endorsed Republican Candidates.

The campaign raised just under $27,000. In final returns, Eidsness netted over 27,000 votes or 11.28% of ballots cast.

2007 switch to Democratic Party

In March 2007, Eidsness declared that he was joining the Democratic Party, declaring: "I am a new Democrat who can bring business savvy and fiscal restraint to the Democratic Party's proposals should I run for Congress in 2008 and win." Media and political observers speculated that this party switch was a prelude to a second run for Congress in 2008.

Eidsness announced another run for Congress, this time running for the Democratic nomination. He withdrew from the race in October 2007, lacking support from the Democratic establishment. Today, Eidsness is registered in Colorado as unaffiliated.

Entrepreneur

Eidsness has served as an independent consultant helping new-start businesses organize and deploy their products and services, including a new-start franchise offering aftermarket printers, the Black Rice Project (Thailand), the reorganization of a Polish/German architectural, engineering and laminate product production company, and the reorganization of a New York-based exclusive resort marketing company.

He stepped down from the corporate world at the age of 50 and began his world travels, initially serving as a crew member on the HM Bark Endeavour Replica, sailing from Hawaii to Fiji. He was the oldest crew member.

References

External links
 Eric Eidsness for Congress
 Guide to the Papers of Eric Eidsness at Colorado State University
 July 2006 Musgrave Watch interview with Eric Eidsness
 Paccione, Musgrave officially have competition, Fort Collins Coloradoan, 1 April 2006.
 Profile at SourceWatch

1944 births
Living people
Vanderbilt University alumni
Reagan administration personnel
People of the United States Environmental Protection Agency
Colorado Republicans
Colorado Democrats
Colorado Independents
Reform Party politicians